Cartwright is an unincorporated community in northwestern McKenzie County, North Dakota, United States. The community is named for Samuel George Cartwright, a rancher, trapper, and hunter who was the first settler in the area. Cartwright lies along North Dakota Highway 200, west of the city of Watford City, the county seat of McKenzie County.  Its elevation is 1,906 feet (581 m).  It has a post office with the ZIP code 58838.

Climate
According to the Köppen Climate Classification system, Cartwright has a semi-arid climate, abbreviated "BSk" on climate maps.

References

External links
Cartwright area history (1976) from the Digital Horizons website

Unincorporated communities in McKenzie County, North Dakota
Unincorporated communities in North Dakota